Eltigen may refer to:

 2217 Eltigen, main-belt asteroid
 Eltigen (Heroyevskoe), part of the city of Kerch, Crimea
 Kerch–Eltigen Operation, World War II amphibious offensive on Crimea by the Red Army